My Man and I is a 1952 American drama film directed by William Wellman, about an ambitious Mexican immigrant farm laborer (Ricardo Montalban), who falls in love with an alcoholic waitress (Shelley Winters) despite being pursued by the beautiful wife of his boss.

The film's sets were designed by the art director James Basevi.

Plot
Chu Chu Ramirez (Ricardo Montalban), a farm laborer from Mexico who works as a grape picker in California, has recently become an American citizen and is determined to better himself. While his cousin Manuel and his friends, Celestino and Willie, spend their pay on gambling and women, Chu Chu buys new clothes and an encyclopedia. When grape season ends, Chu Chu takes a job clearing land for Ansel Ames (Wendell Corey) on Ames' farm near Sacramento. Ames and his wife (Claire Trevor) are having marital problems, and the lonely Mrs. Ames, who initially regards Chu Chu with contempt as a "foreigner," becomes attracted to Chu Chu over time. Chu Chu is friendly and kind to her but does not return her affections and rejects her attempt to seduce him. Instead, Chu Chu is drawn to Nancy (Shelley Winters), a troubled waitress with a drinking problem whose former husband, a test pilot, was killed in a crash. Chu Chu puts up his prized possession, a letter from President Franklin D. Roosevelt, to get money for Nancy and asks her to be his girl although she protests that he should not waste his time on a "wino" like herself.

Meanwhile, Chu Chu has finished his work for Ames and receives his paycheck, but when Chu Chu goes to cash the check, the bank refuses payment. When Chu Chu confronts Ames about the bad check, Ames threatens him with a shotgun. Chu Chu brings the matter before a labor board and is promised his pay within sixty days. He plans to find Nancy, who has moved to Los Angeles and marry her as soon as he receives his pay. However, at the end of the sixty days, when Chu Chu again attempts to collect his pay, Ames attacks him, causing Chu Chu to knock him down and leave. Ames and his wife then argue and Mrs. Ames tells her husband that Chu Chu is worth ten of him, causing Ames to hit her. She falls into a gun rack and a gun goes off, striking Ames in the shoulder. The Ameses falsely accuse Chu Chu of shooting Ames, and he is arrested. After learning that Nancy has attempted suicide in Los Angeles, Chu Chu escapes from jail to rush to her side; they are briefly reunited, but police soon find Chu Chu and take him back into custody.

At Chu Chu's trial, both Ames and Mrs. Ames repeat the false claim that Chu Chu shot Ames, and he is found guilty although the jury requests and the judge grants a light sentence. Nevertheless, Chu Chu will lose his citizenship for being a convict, something he considers a "fate worse than death." Feeling that injustice has been done, Chu Chu's cousin and friends camp just outside the Ames property, staring at the Ameses, playing Mexican songs and doing other things that constantly remind the Ameses of Chu Chu. Nancy, who is still ill, arrives and accuses Mrs. Ames of destroying Chu Chu before she collapses and is rushed to the hospital. The Ameses attempt to reconcile with each other and realize that they must tell the truth that Chu Chu did not shoot Ames even though they will be charged with perjury. After their confession, Chu Chu is released and reunites with Nancy at the hospital.

Cast

Reception
According to MGM records the film earned $469,000 in the US and Canada and $216,000 elsewhere, making a loss to the studio of $563,000.

References

External links
 
 My Man and I at TCMDB
 
 

1952 films
Metro-Goldwyn-Mayer films
1950s English-language films
1952 romantic drama films
American romantic drama films
Films directed by William A. Wellman
Films scored by David Buttolph
Films set in California
American black-and-white films
1950s American films